The National Convergence is a political party in Venezuela.

It was founded in 1993 by former President of Venezuela Rafael Caldera, who was a member of Copei and won a second term in the 1993 elections.

From 1995 to 2004 Eduardo Lapi held the Governorship of Yaracuy for the party. The party boycotted the 2005 elections.

List of presidents

External links
Convergencia

Political parties in Venezuela
Catholic political parties
Christian democratic parties in Venezuela
Political parties established in 1993
1993 establishments in Venezuela
Rafael Caldera